Jimena Sabaris (born 26 October 1989) is a Uruguayan television presenter and actress.

Career 
At the age of 16, she was chosen by a modeling agency to carry out advertising campaigns. She began her acting training at the Luis Trochón School of Musical Comedy and at the Espacio Teatro Academy in Montevideo. She lived in Buenos Aires for two years, where she worked as a children's entertainer and had appearances in theater.

In 2011, she played Vicky in the Uruguayan telenovela Dance! La Fuerza del Corazón. A year later, she had a small appearance in the Argentine telenovela Dulce amor, playing the character of Delfi. In 2015 she was part, along with Belén Bianco and Federico Goyeneche, Tocama, a cheta cumbia band. The first single, «Hay que celebrar» obtained 40 thousand views in three days.

Until 2016, Sabaris worked on the Pop TV signal, and in 2017 she joined the morning program Buen día Uruguay to lead the segment specialized in animal welfare, entitled "Mascoteros". She was also in charge of the program's reports in Punta del Este, during the 2018 summer season. Between 2018 and 2019 she was part of Todas las voces, as the presenter of the program's poll and the one in charge of interaction with viewers.

In 2020, after the departure of Soledad Ortega from Buen día Uruguay, she served as co-host with Leo Lorenzo and Christian Font, until the show went off the air on March 20. Since then, she has been a member of the panel of the morning program Buen Día, hosted by Claudia García. On April 12 of that year, she began hosting Zoom International on Channel 4, a variety show about world news, together with Santiago Wilkins.

On February 18, 2022, it was announced that Sabaris would join the second season of Bake Off Uruguay as its presenter, following the departure of Annasofía Facello.

Filmography

References

External links 

Uruguayan television people
Uruguayan television presenters
Uruguayan television actresses
1989 births
Living people